is a railway station in Kōtō, Tokyo, Japan. Its station number is S-14. The station opened on December 21, 1978.

Platforms
Nishi-ojima Station consists of a single island platform served by two tracks.

Surrounding area
The station is located underneath the intersection of Tokyo Metropolitan Routes 50 (Shin-Ōhashi-dōri) and 306 (Meiji-dōri). The area is a mix of mid-rise office buildings and scattered apartment buildings, with the Ōjima 4-chōme danchi owned by Urban Renaissance to the southeast. Other points of interest include:
 Tokyo Metropolitan High School of Science and Technology
 Kōtō Municipal No. 1 Ōjima Elementary School
 Jōtō Health Center
 Jōtō Post Office
 Tokyo Metropolitan Jōtō Senior High School
 Kōtō Municipal Comprehensive Sports Center
 Jōtō Police Station

Connecting bus service
Toei Bus: Nishi-Ōjima-Ekimae
 To 07: for Monzen-Nakachō and Kinshichō stations
 Kin 18: for Shin-Kiba-Ekimae, Kinshichō Station
 Kyūkō 05: for National Museum of Emerging Science and Innovation, Kinshichō Station
 Ryō 28: for Kasaibashi, Rinkai garage, No. 6 Kasai Elementary School, Ryōgoku Station
 Kame 29: for Nishi-Kasai-Ekimae, Nagisa New Town
 Kame 23: for Minami-Sunamachi Station, Kōtō Geriatric Medical Center, Kameido Station
 Kin 28: for Higashi-Ōjima-Ekimae, Kinshichō Station
 Kusa 24: for Asakusa-Kotobukichō, Higashi-Ōjima-Ekimae via Ōjima Station
 Kame 24: for Kasaibashi; via Nishi-Ōjima Station for Kameido Station

Line
 Tokyo Metropolitan Bureau of Transportation - Toei Shinjuku Line

References

External links

 Tokyo Metropolitan Bureau of Transportation: Nishi-ojima Station

Railway stations in Japan opened in 1978
Railway stations in Tokyo